Kelvin Skidmore Matthewson Thomas  (14 September 191914 June 2019) was a Welsh conductor, composer, baritone, and author. He was the founder and conductor of The Silver Ring Choir of Bath, and one of the founders and first music director of the Bradford-on-Avon Choral Society.

Background 

Born in Grangetown, Cardiff, Wales, Kelvin was one of the five children of the coal merchant Charles Thomas and his wife Lena Thomas. He received musical training from an early age from his musical parents.

As a boy soprano from the age of five, in 1931 (aged twelve) he had a test recording for the Concord record label (the recording was never released). In 1927, the Thomas family removed from Cardiff to Bathampton near Bath, Somerset, and were later involved in the building of Bathampton Methodist Church. During his early years of performances, Thomas once performed in the same concert as the American actor and bass baritone Paul Robeson at the Colston Hall, Bristol.

Having continued his musical studies (also playing the violin and piano) throughout his early years, and his interest in singing continued as a baritone (rather than soprano). After a period employed in his father's business as a coal merchant, he worked for the Engineering firm, Stothert and Pitt.

Musical Activities

The Silver Ring Choir of Bath 
In 1951, he founded the mixed voice chamber choir, The Silver Ring Choir of Bath, and was their Conductor and Musical Director for almost forty years (1951–90). During this time, the Choir featured regularly on BBC Radio and Television (1958–94), achieving great success and winning numerous competitions, including first in its class in the National Eisteddfod of Wales. The Choir also toured various countries including Germany (1961), Hungary (1971), and the United States (1976).

Bradford-on-Avon Choral Society 

In 1986, when the pianist Gaynor Briscoe was founding the Bradford-on-Avon Choral Society, she invited him to become the Society's first Musical Director, a post which he filled for eight years (1986–94). From initial performances of part songs, anthems, and madrigals, the choir progressed to performing works such as Haydn's Creation, Mendelssohn's Elijah, and Brahms's German Requiem, and later participated in annual Trowbridge and West Wiltshire Music Festivals, amongst others. Thomas also arranged and composed numerous pieces of music for these – and other – choirs (SATB), including many traditional Welsh and other melodies. One of his compositions was Samuel's Hymn, which he later recorded with The Silver Ring Choir of Bath.

Other activities 
In addition to being a poet and composer, Thomas was also involved in several local and civic societies and organisations, including the Bathampton Historical Society, and was the author of works on local history. Thomas's lifelong involvement with Bathampton Methodist Church and musical career culminated, in 2013, in a fundraising concert held in his honour entitled My Life in Music during which his music, poetry, and compositions were performed. In 2017, aged 98, he again performed with The Silver Ring Choir of Bath in a Christmas Concert.

Awards 

Thomas's notable local, national, and international activities and contribution to Music was recognised in his appointment as a Member of the Order of the British Empire (MBE) in the 1981 New Year Honours List.

Personal life 
In 1942, Thomas married Megan Jones (1921–2012), and they had five children (two boys and three girls). Singing on the weekend before he died, Thomas died, aged 99, at the Royal United Hospital, Bath, on 14 June 2019.

Bibliography

Books

Musical arrangements

Compositions

Discography

References

External links 
 
 
 
 

 

 
 

2019 deaths
British male conductors (music)
Musicians from Cardiff
21st-century British conductors (music)
20th-century composers
British composers
20th-century British musicians
1919 births
Welsh conductors (music)
Music directors
Members of the Order of the British Empire
21st-century composers
21st-century British musicians
20th-century British male musicians
21st-century British male musicians